Bakri Wahab was an Indonesian politician, belonging to the Communist Party of Indonesia (PKI). Bakri Wahab was the mayor of Salatiga 1961-1966.

References

Indonesian communists
Mayors and regents of places in Central Java
People from Salatiga
Mayors of places in Indonesia